{{DISPLAYTITLE:C11H17NO3}}
The molecular formula C11H17NO3 (molar mass: 211.25 g/mol, exact mass: 211.120843 u) may refer to:

 BOHD (psychedelic)
 2C-O
 Isomescaline
 Isoprenaline
 Mescaline, a natural psychedelic alkaloid
 Methoxamine
 Orciprenaline

Molecular formulas